Jimmy Shields (January 1900 – 13 April 1949) was a British communist activist and newspaper editor.

Born in Greenock, Shields joined the Communist Party of Great Britain (CPGB) in 1921. Out of work, he moved to South Africa in 1925, where he joined the Communist Party of South Africa, becoming its General Secretary within months.  During this period, one of his speeches convinced Edwin Thabo Mofutsanyana to join the party.

Shields returned to Scotland in 1927, where he served in various posts for the CPGB, culminating in his election to the national executive. He also served as editor of the Daily Worker. From 1932, he also served as the British representative to the Comintern, and he travelled extensively as head of the CPGB's international department.

Shields contracted tuberculosis during World War II and spent much of the war at Holt Sanitorium. He died there in 1949.

References

1900 births
1949 deaths
Communist Party of Great Britain members
Members of the South African Communist Party
People from Greenock
Scottish newspaper editors
White South African anti-apartheid activists